The 1984 Santa Clara Broncos football team represented Santa Clara University as a member of the Western Football Conference (WFC) during the 1984 NCAA Division II football season. The Broncos were led by head coach Pat Malley in his 26th and final year at the helm. The 1984 team played home games at Buck Shaw Stadium in Santa Clara, California. They finished the season with a record of seven wins and four losses (7–4, 1–2 WFC). The Broncos outscored their opponents 173–144 for the season. O'Malley finished his career at Santa Clara with an overall record of 142–100–3, a winning percentage of .586.

Schedule

References

Santa Clara
Santa Clara Broncos football seasons
Santa Clara Broncos football